The Doctor of Information Technology (DIT) is a research-oriented professional doctoral degree offered by some universities. It is of the same academic level as traditional PhD; however, DIT research focuses more on industry practice than on theoretical framework. Upon successful completion, the title of "Doctor" is awarded and the post-nominals of DIT can be used.

Institutions offering DIT degrees

Australia
 Charles Sturt University
 Edith Cowan University 
 Monash University
 Murdoch University 
 Queensland University of Technology 
 University of Ballarat 
 University of New South Wales
 University of South Australia

Italy 

 University of Parma
 Sapienza University of Rome
 Mediterranea University of Reggio Calabria

Namibia
 University of Namibia

Philippines
 AMA University Quezon City, Philippines
 Angeles University Foundation
 Colegio de San Juan de Letran Calamba (Laguna)
 De La Salle University
 Divine Word College of Laoag
 La Consolacion University Philippines (Bulacan)
 St. Linus University
 St. Paul University - Tuguegarao
 Technological Institute of the Philippines
 University of the Cordilleras

United States
 Aspen University
 Atlantic International University
 Capella University
 City University of Seattle
 George Mason University
 Middle Georgia State University
 MIT
 Stratford University
 Trine University
 University of Texas, San Antonio
 Walden University

Mexico
 University of Guadalajara
 Popular Autonomous University of Puebla

References

Information Technology, Doctor of
Information technology qualifications